Michael Rose may refer to:

Music
Michael Rose (singer)  (born 1957), Jamaican reggae singer
Michael Rose (album)

Sportspeople
Michael Rose (footballer, born 1982), English footballer
Michael Rose (footballer, born 1995), Scottish footballer for Coventry City F.C.
Michael Rose (cricketer) (born 1942), English cricketer
Mike Rose (baseball) (born 1976), American baseball player
Mike Rose (basketball) (born 1987), American basketball player
Mike Rose (American football), American football linebacker
Mike Rose (Canadian football) (born 1992), Canadian football defensive lineman

Others
Michael R. Rose (born 1955), evolutionary biologist
Mike Rose (painter) (1932–2006), German painter, set designer and writer
Sir Michael Rose (British Army officer) (born 1940), British general
Mike Rose (educator) (1944–2021), American educationist
Gary Michael Rose (born 1947), retired American Army officer; recipient of Medal of Honor
Michael Alec Rose (born 1959), composer
Michael E. Rose (born 1954), Canadian author
Michael Rose (EastEnders)

See also
 Michael Rosen (disambiguation)